Chester Arthur "Chet" Spencer (March 4, 1883 – November 10, 1938) was a Major League Baseball outfielder. In eight career games, he had four hits in 27 at-bats. He batted left and threw right-handed.

Spencer was born in South Webster, Ohio and died in Portsmouth, Ohio.

External links

1883 births
1938 deaths
Boston Beaneaters players
Major League Baseball outfielders
Minor league baseball managers
Springfield Reapers players
Portsmouth Cobblers players
Rochester Bronchos players
Rochester Hustlers players
New London Planters players
Montgomery Rebels players
Baseball players from Ohio
People from Scioto County, Ohio